The Halifax Cup was a cricket tournament held in Philadelphia, Pennsylvania between 1880 and 1926.  A variety of clubs from the Philadelphia region were involved in the competition, including most principally the Philadelphia Cricket Club, Belmont Cricket Club, Germantown Cricket Club and Merion Cricket Club.

Winners

References

1880 establishments in Pennsylvania
American domestic cricket competitions
Cricket in Philadelphia
United States cricket in the 19th century
United States cricket in the 20th century
1926 disestablishments in Pennsylvania
Recurring sporting events established in 1880
Recurring sporting events disestablished in 1926